Belton New Tech High School is a public high school located in Belton, Texas, United States, in the Belton Independent School District. Centered around project-based-learning, the school serves all of BISD, including the city of Belton and Bell County. In 2015, the school was rated "Met Standard" by the Texas Education Agency.

Project-based learning 
Project-based learning is a form of education in which students are expected and encouraged to make projects that connect the curriculum to a real-world, sometimes community-based, application.

Enrollment Process
The school enrolls new freshman on a first-come first served basis through a campout that usually takes place in April. The first 100 students that have a representative are automatically enrolled in the school on Saturday morning the week of the campout. The following spots are decided by a lottery draw, granted there are enough applicants that exceed a total 125. It is usual in years past that representative of students begin to arrive Thursday the week of the campout and arrive through Friday night. Students of incoming freshman very commonly spend Friday night camping with guardians. Since the move from Tiger Field to nearby Wilson-Kerzee, current students at Belton New Tech use the camp as a meet and greet during the Friday school day where they will mingle with incoming freshman. Furthermore, on the same evening, many clubs use the camp as a form of recruitment, most notably the Quidditch club who premieres the All-Star game for campers. Because of the COVID-19 virus, the campout was not available in person in 2020.

ICE Awards
The ICE (Innovation Creativity Excellence) Awards is an annual event that showcases the best projects of the year. Since 2016 a category has been added to included the best middle-school project in BISD.

 Best Independent Creative Work
 Henry T. Waskow Community Service Award
  Real World Application of Math and Science
 Best Use of Written or Spoken Word
 Best in History, Literature, and World Language
 Best Use of Digital Media in a Project
 Best Use of Innovation in a Project
 Project of the Year
 Best Middle School Project

Stand Alone Campus

In 2021 it was announced that Belton New Tech would become a stand alone campus after partnering with Belton High School for over 10 Years. This decision involved adding new classrooms to the campus, as well as stand-alone electives such as Musical Theatre, track, a law program, a drone program, and more. Belton Independent School District also chose a new mascot; The Dragons. This decision was made after much deliberation by students and staff, and was ultimately chosen both in honor of the culture and community at the former Harris High School (which was the African American high school in Belton Texas until it was integrated into Belton High School in 1964), whose mascot was the Dragons, as well as a nod to the engineering and creativity that Belton New Tech fosters on campus. The colors chosen for the campus were Red and white (Belton High School's colors) as well as purple to reflect BNT@W's status as a Purple Heart school and the commitment each student makes to improve their community.

References

External links
Official Website

Schools in Bell County, Texas
Public high schools in Texas